Mother's Day is a 1980 American rape and revenge slasher film directed, co-written and produced by Charles Kaufman, brother of Troma Entertainment co-founder Lloyd Kaufman (who acted as an associate producer of the film). The plot focuses on three women on a camping excursion who fall victim to two deranged, murderous young men and their unhinged mother. The film contains elements of the satire, thriller and slasher genres.

Upon its release, Mother's Day received criticism for its depiction of violence and rape, and was banned in the United Kingdom by the British Board of Film Classification. While not a success during its release and receiving a negative reception from critics, the film has since developed a cult following. It has also been subject to critical analysis from film scholars for its subtextual commentary on consumerism and the proliferation of television in popular culture. A loose remake of the same name was released in 2010.

Plot
During a Growth Opportunity graduation, (a parody of Erhard Seminars Training), a couple named Terry and Charlie are offered a ride from an old woman and are driven into the woods. After the old woman's car stalls, two inbred killers appear and attack; Charlie is decapitated with a machete in the backseat while Terry is brutally assaulted before being garroted by the old lady. It is revealed that the dual killers named Ike and Addley are the woman's sons.

Meanwhile, three women who have been friends since college—Trina, Abbey, and Jackie—prepare for an annual "mystery weekend" trip, where one of them arranges a getaway in a location unknown to the other two. Jackie, who lives in New York City, has planned a camping trip for them in the Deep Barrens, a forested area in rural New Jersey. Trina, a glamorous model living in Los Angeles, and Abbey, who returned to Chicago after college to care for her ailing mother, travel to New Jersey, where Jackie picks them up. After stopping at a nearby store for supplies, they arrive at their destination and begin to camp. While in the woods, they begin to explore, sitting around the campfire telling stories and having fun by swimming and fishing. Unbeknownst to them, they are being stalked by Ike and Addley. In the middle of the night, Ike and Addley attack the women, binding and gagging them. The three are taken by Ike and Addley to a ramshackle home in the woods where they live with their unhinged mother, whom they impress by torturing people. The brothers tie the women to exercise equipment inside the home, but Jackie is swiftly selected by Mother to be the brothers' first victim and is taken outside. Addley rapes Jackie while Ike photographs it, and Mother looks on encouragingly.

Abbey and Trina awaken the following day and plan to escape while Mother and her boys exercise outside. During their exercise routine, Mother is alarmed when she spots her deformed sister Queenie—who lives in the woods and subsists on vermin—roaming in the distance. Inside the house, Abbey and Trina discover Terry and Charlie's bodies, and find a brutalized Jackie hidden inside a drawer. The three women manage to escape and flee into the woods. While Ike searches for the women, Addley remains at home with Mother where he questions Queenie's existence and if Mother's claims are just a ploy to keep the boys at home with her. As Jackie is unable to move quickly because of her injuries, Trina and Abbey become separated. Trina finds the car destroyed and is chased by Ike, while Jackie peacefully dies of her wounds. Ike eventually loses track of Trina, and she reunites with Abbey for revenge against Mother and the brothers.

The next morning, Abbey and Trina arm themselves with weapons and begin to invade the cabin to avenge Jackie. Trina castrates Addley with a clawhammer before Abbey suffocates him. When the women drag Addley's body outside, Ike leaps from a second-story window and attacks them. Enraged over his brother's death, Ike tries to strangle Trina before Abbey pours Drano down his throat. He chases the women into the house, where Abbey slams a television set on his head before Trina stabs him to death with an electric knife. With the brothers dead, the girls confront Mother in the basement where she is watching television, and sadistically suffocate her with a pair of inflatable breasts. With their vengeance complete, the two girls make a burial for Jackie and prepare to leave the woods before they are suddenly attacked by Queenie who leaps at them from behind the bushes.

Cast

Analysis and themes
Film scholar John Kenneth Muir, though dismissive of the film, notes that it is considered "a satire of our TV society, since the film is littered with references to pop culture. For instance, you'll see the U.S.S. Enterprise, a Batman action figure, Ernie (of Bert and Ernie of Sesame Street), G.I. Joe, and even King Kong. You'll see Trix cereal, and a death by a television set".

Writer Scott Aaron Stine proposed this sentiment in his book The Gorehound's Guide to Splatter Films of the 1980s, writing that the film "makes pointed stabs at consumerism, pop psychology, TV culture, parental expectations, and even the gratuitous excesses of the '70s". Critic Phil Hardy has similarly noted: "As satire, Mother's Day works rather well, opening with a knock at encounter groups...  and moving on to make a swipe at American motherhood. The film ends as a gross parody of consumerism, with McGuire and McQuade eating junk cereals by the bucketful, endlessly arguing whether punk is better than disco, collecting Sesame Street and Star Trek merchandising and raping and killing, 'just like I seen on TV'".

Release
Mother's Day first opened in the United States on September 19, 1980, playing on 90 screens in the New York City metropolitan area. It continued to screen in various U.S. cities throughout the remainder of the year, opening in Tucson, Arizona on November 7, and Los Angeles on November 14.

The United Kingdom's film rating board (BBFC) rejected the film in 1980, banning it from distribution. The film was shown several times on the Horror Channel between 2005 and 2008, with no cuts but it was not passed for release on home media until 2015, when it passed uncut with an 18 certificate.

In Australia, the film was originally passed uncut with an R 18+ in 1983 by the Australian censors but was later banned when reviewed in 1985.

The role of Ike was erroneously credited to actor Frederick Coffin on various internet sites for years. Several actors from the production confirmed that the actor's true identity was Gary Pollard. He has allegedly passed away.

Critical response
Mother's Day received significant criticism for its depiction of violence, particularly violence against women. Kevin Thomas of the Los Angeles Times wrote: "Any traces of talent and dark humor that might show through Mother's Day are drowned by the cynicism and horrendousness of the entire enterprise". Roger Ebert famously despised the film, giving it zero stars in a review and saying how disgusted he was at its violence, gore, rape and torture during "Sneak Previews", writing "the question of why anyone of any age would possibly want to see this movie remains without an answer". Ted Serrill of The Central New Jersey Home News criticized the "cartoonish acting and awkward camera set-ups", as well as its failure "to generate terror, much less suspense". Catherine Chapin of The Charlotte Observer panned the film for its violent content, writing that it "makes censorship seem like a good idea", and that it "has no socially redeeming warning message".

In the Detroit Free Press, Jack Mathews encapsulated: "How much space should a newspaper devote to a review of a film such as Mother's Day, a repulsively graphic and vile story about a pair of retarded backwoods brothers who drag young women home to rape and bat around for the pleasure of their demented, sadistic mother? As little as possible". Tom Sullivan of The Herald-News panned the film, deeming it "just plain sick. And not especially entertaining, even at its better moments", while Ernest LeoGrande of the New York Daily News expressed a similar sentiment, giving the film a zero-star rating and writing: "The day homicidal rape becomes funny, Mother's Day may be considered a comedy. For the meantime, director Charles Kaufman has perverted his obvious sense of the ridiculous to pander to the audience for pornographic violence".

On the internet review aggregator Rotten Tomatoes, the film holds a 46% approval rating, based on 13 reviews, with an average rating of 4.8/10. On Metacritic, the film has a weighted average score of 1 out of 100, based on 4 critics, indicating "overwhelming dislike".

Home media
Mother's Day received a VHS release in 1983 by Media Home Entertainment, and later by Video Treasures in 1988. It was released on DVD on October 31, 2000 by Troma Entertainment.

A new DVD and Blu-ray was released September 4, 2012 by Anchor Bay Entertainment. The film was released for the first time in the United Kingdom as Number 02 of 88 Films "Slasher's Classics Collection" series on Blu-ray on February 23, 2015.

Remake
The remake of Mother's Day directed by Darren Lynn Bousman and produced by Brett Ratner was released at Fantastic Fest in September 2010 and in the United Kingdom in June 2011. The film received several pushbacks, but was released on DVD and Blu-ray on March 8, 2012.

References

Sources

External links
 
 
 
 Mother's Day – on the Troma Entertainment movie database
 Overview in New York Times

1980 films
1980 horror films
1980 thriller films
American horror thriller films
American independent films
American satirical films
Films set in 1970
Films set in 1980
Films set in New Jersey
1980s exploitation films
American rape and revenge films
American serial killer films
Troma Entertainment films
Films originally rejected by the British Board of Film Classification
1980s English-language films
1980s American films